The Russian Academy or Imperial Russian Academy was established in St. Petersburg, Russia, in 1783 by Empress Catherine II of Russia and princess Dashkova as a research center for Russian language and Russian literature, following the example of the Académie française. In 1841 it was merged into the Imperial Saint Petersburg Academy of Sciences (the predecessor of today's Russian Academy of Sciences).

Presidents 
 1783–1796 – Yekaterina Dashkova (concurrently serving as the Director of the Imperial Academy of Arts and Sciences)
 1796–1801 – Pavel Bakunin (Бакунин, Павел Петрович) (concurrently serving as the Director, and later President, of the Imperial Academy of Arts and Sciences)
 1801–1813 – Andrey Andreyevich Nartov (Нартов, Андрей Андреевич)
 1813–1841 – Aleksandr Shishkov (Шишков, Александр Семёнович)

See also

 V.V. Vinogradov Russian Language Institute of the Russian Academy of Sciences - a modern institution (founded in 1944), playing a similar role

 
Russian language
Russian Empire
Language regulators
Russian National Academies
Russia
1783 establishments in the Russian Empire
Organizations established in 1783